Sayala (locally called as Hayala) is a town in the Jalore district of Rajasthan, in north-west India. It is the headquarters of Sayala Tehsil. Sayala is Well Connected with Roads. It is One of the Major Developing Area in Jalor District.

Demographics
As of the 2001 Indian census, Sayala had a population of 12873. Males constitute 6,657 of the population and females 6,216.As Of 2021 The Population of the Village is Nearly 70,000. Majority of the Population is Hindus. Muslims are Minority in this Region.

References

Sayla Population
Coordinates

Villages in Jalore district